Stan VanDerBeek (January 6, 1927 – September 19, 1984) was an American experimental filmmaker known for his collage works.

Life 

VanDerBeek studied art and architecture at Manhattan's Cooper Union before transferring to Black Mountain College in North Carolina, where he met polymath Buckminster Fuller, composer John Cage, and choreographer Merce Cunningham. Beginning in 1949, he took two terms of photography courses from Hazel Larsen Archer at the institution.

In the 1950s, he directed independent art films while learning animation techniques and painting scenery and set designs for Winky Dink and You. His earliest films, made between 1955 and 1965, mostly consist of animated paintings and collage films, combined in a form of organic development.

VanDerBeek's ironic compositions were created very much in the spirit of the surreal and Dadaist collages of Max Ernst, but with a wild, rough informality more akin to the expressionism of the Beat Generation. 

In the 1960s, VanDerBeek began working with the likes of Claes Oldenburg and Jim Dine, as well as representatives of modern dance and expanded cinema, such as Merce Cunningham and Elaine Summers. Contemporaneously, he designed shows using multiple projectors at his Movie Drome theater at Stony Point, New York. The Movie Drome was a grain silo dome which he turned into his "infinite projection screen." Visitors entered the dome through a trap-door in the floor, and were encouraged after entering to spread out over the floor and lie with their feet pointing towards the center. Once inside, the audience experienced a dynamic inter-dispersal of movies and images around them, created by over a dozen slide and film projectors filling the concave surface with a dense collage of moving imagery. These presentations contained a very great number of random image sequences and continuities, with the result that none of the performances were alike.

His desire for the utopian led him to collaborate with Ken Knowlton at Bell Labs, where dozens of computer animated films and holographic experiments were created by the end of the 1960s. These included Poem Field (1964-1968), a series of eight computer-generated animations.

During the same period, he taught at many universities, researching new methods of representation, from the steam projections at the Guggenheim Museum to the interactive television transmissions of his Violence Sonata, broadcast on several channels in 1970. He directed the University of Maryland, Baltimore County visual arts program until his death.

Family
He had two children (August, Maximus) from his marriage to Johanna Vanderbeek. Three additional children from his second marriage to Louise VanDerBeek are Julia VanDerBeek and artists Sara VanDerBeek and Johannes VanDerBeek

Legacy
His movie Breathdeath (1963)  was a huge influence on Terry Gilliam (who, nonetheless, once mistakenly referred to it as Death Breath).

VanDerBeek's work and legacy has been the focus of several retrospective exhibitions, including the following:
 Amazement Park: Stan, Sara and Johannes VanDerBeek (2009) at The Frances Young Tang Teaching Museum and Art Gallery at Skidmore College, Saratoga Springs, NY
 Stan VanDerBeek – The Cultural Intercom (2011) at MIT List Visual Arts Center, Cambridge, MA (traveled to Museum of Contemporary Art, Houston, TX)
 Jon Rafman / Stan VanDerBeek (2017) at Sprüth Magers, Los Angeles, CA, curated by Johannes Fricke Waldthausen
 VanDerBeek + VanDerBeek (2019) at Black Mountain College Museum + Arts Center, co-curated by Sara VanDerBeek and Chelsea Spengemann, Director of the Stan VanDerBeek Archive.

See also
Terry Gilliam
Cutout animation
Computer animation

References

External links
 Stan Vanderbeek on IMDb
Stan VanDerBeek Estate
 Stan Vanderbeek on UbuWeb

1927 births
1984 deaths
American experimental filmmakers
American animators
Artists from Baltimore
Cooper Union alumni
American video artists
New media artists
Black Mountain College alumni
Film directors from Maryland
University of Maryland, Baltimore County faculty
Collage filmmakers
Deaths from cancer in Maryland
Burials at Green River Cemetery